Odoorn is a village in the Dutch province of Drenthe. It is a part of the municipality of Borger-Odoorn, and lies about nine km north of Emmen.

History 
The village was first mentioned in 1327 as "Remboldus in Oderen". It is assumed it means "settlement of the people of Odheri (person)", because older forms often used the suffix -ing. 

Odoorn is an esdorp which developed in the Early Middle Ages on the Hondsrug along the road from Groningen to Coevorden. In the 13th century, a daughter church of Anloo was established in the village, and it developed into the central settlement for the satellites Valthe and Exloo.

The Dutch Reformed church was built around 1200 and is built using many large stones. Some of the stones have probably been taken from nearby hunebedden (dolmen). The church suffered a collapse in 1634. It was extensively modified between 1856 and 1857. In 1897, it was restored after a fire.

The hunebed (dolmen)  is located near Odoorn. It is still half buried in the ground. It used to have five capstones, however one has gone missing.

Odoorn was home to 348 people in 1840. On 22 July 1945, three children were playing with left-over German ammunition, and they were killed when the ammunition exploded. In 1997, a memorial was placed at the site. Odoorn was a separate municipality until 1998, when it merged with Borger.

Festivals
Odoorn hosts the multi-culture festival .

Gallery

References

External links

Municipalities of the Netherlands disestablished in 1998
Populated places in Drenthe
Former municipalities of Drenthe
Borger-Odoorn